Bob Delle Bovi is an American former head coach of the Manhattan Jaspers basketball team. He currently works as an English teacher at Pleasantville High School (New York) in Pleasantville, New York. He is also the current head coach of the Hastings Yellow Jackets in Hastings on Hudson, NY.

References

Basketball coaches from New York (state)
Manhattan Jaspers basketball coaches
People from Pleasantville, New York